Tilly is a feminine given name or nickname, and a surname. It is generally a variant/diminutive for the German name Matilda.

This name may refer to:

Given name or nickname
 Tilly Armstrong (1927–2010), British romance novelist
 Tilly Aston (1873–1947), blind Australian writer and teacher, promoter of the rights of the vision-impaired
 Tilly Bagshawe (born 1973), British writer 
 Tilly Bébé (1879–1932), Austrian circus performer
 Tilly Decker (born 1930), Luxembourgian sprinter 
 Tilly Devine (born 1900), English-born Australian organised crime boss
 Tilly Edinger (1897–1967), German-American paleontologist and the founder of paleoneurology
 Tilly Hirst (1941–2021), New Zealand netball player
 Tilly Keeper (born 1997), British actress
 Tilly Key (born 1984), R&B/pop singer from the island of Corsica
 Tilly Losch (1903–1975), Austrian dancer, choreographer, actress, and painter
 Tilly O'Neill-Gordon (born 1949), Canadian politician
 Tilly Smith (born 1994), credited with saving about 100 beachgoers by recognising the signs of an approaching tsunami
 Tilly Spiegel (1906–1988), Austrian political activist
 Tilly van der Zwaard (1938–2019), Dutch middle distance runner
 Tilly Walnes (born 1980), English fashion designer, author and educator

Surname
 Charles Tilly (1929–2008), American sociologist
 Friedrich Georg Tilly, mayor of Warsaw from 1799 to 1806
 Jennifer Tilly (born 1958), American actress and poker player, sister of Meg Tilly
 Louise A. Tilly (born 1930), American historian
 Meg Tilly (born 1960), American actress and author, sister of Jennifer Tilly

See also
 Tilly (disambiguation)
 Tillie (name)

Feminine given names
Lists of people by nickname
Hypocorisms